Vincent R. Mathews was a member of the Wisconsin State Assembly.

Biography
Mathews was born on June 8, 1912 in Watertown, Wisconsin. He graduated from Carroll University.

Career
Mathews, a Democrat, was elected to the Assembly in 1958. Previously, he was a Waukesha, Wisconsin alderman from 1946 to 1950. He also owned an insurance business in Waukesha. He died in Madison, Wisconsin on April 7, 2005.

References

Politicians from Watertown, Wisconsin
Politicians from Waukesha, Wisconsin
Democratic Party members of the Wisconsin State Assembly
Wisconsin city council members
Carroll University alumni
Businesspeople from Wisconsin
1912 births
2005 deaths
20th-century American politicians
20th-century American businesspeople